Borčany is a village and municipality in Bánovce nad Bebravou District in the Trenčín Region of north-western Slovakia.

History
In historical records the village was first mentioned in 1113.

Geography
The municipality lies at an altitude of 195 metres and covers an area of 3.11 km². It has a population of about 260 people.

Genealogical resources

The records for genealogical research are available at the state archive "Statny

Archiv in Nitra, Slovakia"

See also
 List of municipalities and towns in Slovakia

References

External links

 Official page
https://web.archive.org/web/20071116010355/http://www.statistics.sk/mosmis/eng/run.html
Surnames of living people in Borcany

Villages and municipalities in Bánovce nad Bebravou District